Marrellomorpha are an extinct group of arthropods known from the Cambrian to the Early Devonian. They lacked mineralised hard parts, so are only known from areas of exceptional preservation, limiting their fossil distribution. The best known member is Marrella, with thousands of specimens found in the Cambrian aged Burgess Shale of Canada. The group is divided up into two major orders, Marrellida and Acercostraca. Marrellida is recognised by the possession of head shields with two or three pairs of elongate spine-like projections, and three pairs of uniramous appendages on the cephalon, while Acercostraca generally have large ovoid carapaces that cover the entire upper half of the body, and five pairs of uniramous cephalic appendages. Both groups have unbranched antennules and a segmented trunk with biramous appendages. Recent research has suggested the previously enigmatic Cambrian trliobite-like arthropods Skania and Primicaris may belong to this group. Their phylogenetic position is uncertain, various studies have alternatively placed them within in the Arachnomorpha as relatives of Artiopoda (trilobites and kin), as stem-group Mandibulata, or as stem group euarthropods.

Taxonomy 
After Moysiuk et al, 2022.
 Acercostraca
 ?Skania Burgess Shale, Canada, Cambrian (Miaolingian) ? Kaili Formation, China, Cambrian (Wuliuan)
 ?Primicaris Burgess Shale, Canada, Cambrian (Miaolingian), Maotianshan Shales, China, Cambrian Stage 3
 Vachonisiidae 
 Xylokorys Coalbrookdale Formation, England, Silurian (Wenlock)
 Vachonisia Hunsrück Slate, Germany, Lower Devonian (Emsian)
 Enosiaspis Fezouata Formation, Morocco, Early Ordovician (Floian)
 Marrellida
 Marrella Balang Formation, China, Cambrian Stage 4 Kaili Formation, China, Cambrian (Wuliuan), Burgess Shale, Canada, Cambrian (Miaolingian)
 Furca Letná Formation, Czech Republic, Upper Ordovician (Sandbian)
 "Furca" mauretanica (nomen nudum) Fezouata Formation, Morocco, Early Ordovician (Floian)
 "Mimetaster" florestaensis Floresta Formation Argentina, Lower Ordovician (Tremadocian)
 Mimetasteridae
 Tomlinsonus Kirkfield Formation, Canada, Late Ordovician (Katian)
 Mimetaster Hunsrück Slate, Germany, Lower Devonian (Emsian)

Fragmentary taxa assigned to Marrellomorpha include Austromarrella from Cambrian Series 3 aged deposits in Australia, and Dyrnwynia from the Ordovician (Darriwilian) aged Llanfallteg Formation of Wales, which in its original description was assigned to Marrelida.

Gallery

References

 
Paleozoic arthropods
Arthropod classes